Passow may refer to:

Places
Passow, Brandenburg, a municipality in Brandenburg, Germany
Passow, Mecklenburg-Vorpommern, a municipality in Mecklenburg-Vorpommern, Germany

People with the surname
Franz Passow (1786–1833), German classical scholar and lexicographer